Ratchet & Clank: Rift Apart is a 2021 third-person shooter platform game developed by Insomniac Games and published by Sony Interactive Entertainment for the PlayStation 5. It is the ninth main and sixteenth overall installment in the Ratchet & Clank series, with the game serving as a follow up to 2013's Ratchet & Clank: Into the Nexus. Rift Apart was announced in June 2020 and was released on June 11, 2021.

The game received positive reviews, with particular praise given to its visuals, combat and technical advancements. It sold 1.1 million units by July 2021.

Gameplay 

The game shares many gameplay similarities with Ratchet & Clank (2016) and other entries in the series. It retains elements of previous Ratchet & Clank games, such as strafing, gunplay, collection of bolts, automatic weapon and health upgrades, manual Raritanium weapon upgrading and gadgets. The main playable character is Ratchet. He is accompanied by his robotic friend and sidekick Clank, who is hung on his back. Additionally, the game has a playable female Lombax named Rivet, as well as a robot similar to Clank, Kit. The player navigates Ratchet and Rivet through diverse environments across a multitude of levels, defeating enemies with an array of varied weapons and gadgets, and traversing obstacles to complete key mission objectives.

The game introduces to the series the concept of real-time near instantaneous travel between different areas, planets and other worlds within gameplay scenes via a system of inter-dimensional portals. In order for the player to utilize this feature, a new mechanic dubbed the "Rift Tether" is introduced in Ratchet and Rivet's arsenal that pulls them from one side of a portal to another, allowing them to move quickly between points. The game features the return of planets explored in previous entries with a dimensional twist, through their alternate counterparts, alongside new planets not seen previously in the franchise.  The game features enhanced mobility and traversal options with the addition of moves such as dashing and wall running. In addition, the game's arsenal features a mix of brand new weapons and returning classics from prior installments.

The game features an assortment of accessibility options, including a high contrast mode and toggles for simplified traversal, camera sensitivity, flight assistance, etc., to ensure that all players can enjoy the gameplay and complete the story.

Plot 
In light of their previous heroics, Ratchet (James Arnold Taylor) and Clank (David Kaye) are celebrated as galactic heroes. During a parade in their honor, Clank reveals that he has repaired the Dimensionator, a device capable of opening rifts to other dimensions so that Ratchet can search for the Lombax race and his missing family. However, Doctor Nefarious (Armin Shimerman) suddenly attacks the parade and attempts to steal the Dimensionator, but during the struggle however, Ratchet unthinkingly shoots the Dimensionator, which causes dimensional rifts to begin opening randomly. Ratchet, Clank, and Dr. Nefarious end up being transported to an alternate universe, the Dimensionator then explodes, which damages the fabric of space and time and separates the three. Clank awakens to find himself alone and now missing his right arm from the blast. Clank is then discovered and picked up by a female Lombax named Rivet (Jennifer Hale). Meanwhile, Dr. Nefarious ends up in a throne room, where he is mistaken for Emperor Nefarious (Robin Atkin Downes), an alternate version of Nefarious who, unlike him, has never been defeated in this dimension. Ratchet meanwhile, finds himself alone and starts his search for Clank. With the emperor currently absent on a conquest, Dr. Nefarious secretly assumes his identity and sends his new minions after Ratchet and Rivet.

While searching, Ratchet witnesses Rivet escaping the planet with Clank. Ratchet encounters Phantom (the alternate Skidd), a member of the Resistance opposed to Emperor Nefarious, who gifts him an electronic helper named Glitch to help him get a ship to follow Rivet. Rivet takes Clank to her hideout, where Clank investigates a dimensional anomaly and makes contact with a prophet named Gary, who enlists his help in repairing dimensional anomalies to prevent the Dimensional Cataclysm. Rivet repairs Clank's communicator and he and Rivet are able to contact Ratchet and come up with a plan to rebuild the Dimensionator so they can return to their own home dimension and stop the Dimensional Cataclysm.

Ratchet heads out to find the blueprint for the Dimensionator, and recruits one of Gary's robot apprentices, Kit (Debra Wilson), to be his partner. Kit warns Ratchet that she is a Warbot built by Emperor Nefarious and she might lose control of her programming and attack him, but Ratchet reassures her that they make a good team. They then head to a secret lab to forge a new Dimensionator, while Rivet and Clank head out to gather the Phase Quartz needed to power it, but it is accidentally destroyed. With no other choice, Rivet and Clank search for the mythical Fixer who can repair anything and convince him to overcome his own self-doubt to repair the Phase Quartz. Ratchet and Rivet then finally meet, with Clank reuniting with Ratchet and Kit agreeing to become Rivet's partner. They then complete the Dimensionator, only for Dr. Nefarious to arrive and steal it. Dr. Nefarious is defeated, but the real Emperor Nefarious arrives, easily defeating Ratchet and Rivet and stealing the Dimensionator for himself, which he plans to use to eliminate Captain Quantum (the alternate Captain Qwark) and destroy the Resistance once and for all.

Rivet pursues Emperor Nefarious, but he uses the Dimensionator to banish her to a pocket dimension. As Rivet searches for a rift to escape through, she tells Kit about how she lost her arm to a Warbot attack, and Kit realizes she is responsible. Ratchet heads out to try and warn Captain Quantum, but fails to stop Emperor Nefarious from banishing Captain Quantum through a rift. Emperor Nefarious celebrates finally conquering the universe but doesn't feel fulfilled until he realizes he can use the Dimensionator to conquer every dimension. Spying on Emperor Nefarious, Ratchet, and Rivet realize Emperor Nefarious will need the Dimensional Map and head out to intercept him. Rivet and Kit board Emperor Nefarious' flagship and rescue Gary, who reveals he hid the Dimensional Map inside a dimensional anomaly. Ratchet and Clank recover the Dimensional Map but are ambushed by Emperor Nefarious and banished through a rift. Kit transforms into her Warbot form to try and stop Emperor Nefarious, shocking Rivet, but Kit ends up being banished through a rift as well.

Left alone, Rivet heads for the prison facility Emperor Nefarious has banished all of his enemies and stages a prison break, freeing Ratchet and Clank as well as the rest of the Resistance. However, still feeling guilty over causing the loss of Rivet's arm, Kit decides to leave the group. As the Resistance regroups, Emperor Nefarious announces that he plans to start invading other dimensions, starting with Ratchet and Clank's home dimension. Ratchet, Clank, Rivet, and the Resistance pursue Emperor Nefarious through the rift. Ratchet and Clank destroy Emperor Nefarious' giant power suit, and Kit returns to hold his forces at bay while Rivet confronts Emperor Nefarious personally. Working together, everybody, including Dr. Nefarious, manages to defeat and send Emperor Nefarious to his demise through a rift. Clank recovers the Dimensionator and uses it to repair the dimensions, averting the Dimensional Cataclysm.

In the credits, citizens of Nefarious City begin dismantling the regime's legacy, Dr. Nefarious reunites with Lawrence, who is now a father, and Gary shares his findings with his father, The Plumber. With reality saved and the Dimensionator in their possession, Ratchet, Clank, Rivet, and Kit take the opportunity to hang out together, repair the damage Emperor Nefarious caused, build a new arm for Clank, and go on additional adventures.

Development 
Ratchet & Clank: Rift Apart was developed by Insomniac Games as a PlayStation 5 exclusive title. Unlike past games in the Ratchet & Clank series where development was helmed by the secondary team in North Carolina, Rift Apart was developed by the entire team from both studios. Ratchet & Clank: Rift Apart features a full-length, stand-alone storyline that is intended to appeal to veterans and newcomers of the series, while serving as a follow up to both Ratchet & Clank: Into the Nexus and the 2016 reboot Ratchet & Clank. It was co-directed by Creative Director Marcus Smith and Game Director Mike Daly.

Insomniac Games received PlayStation 5 development kits early on in the console's development cycle and the team promptly started work on conceptualization. Creative Director Marcus Smith stated that, initially, they were confronted with the quandary of how to make the game appealing to both long-running series fans and new players who may have not even been born when the last full-length game in the series was released. Initial ideas for Ratchet & Clank: Rift Apart came about after the team had multiple discussions about the possibilities offered by improvements made in next-gen hardware. Game director, Mike Daly said that they knew from the start the game would be a PS5 exclusive and they wanted to take advantage of that fact. He added that "we wanted to make a game that was new and took the experience further than it had before. When we were thinking about what we could do, knowing what we could never do before, it became clear that so much of the structure of games is informed by how you're able to load things into memory." Regarding the ease up of workflows due to the PS5's custom-designed SSD, Smith stated that the "game utilizes dimensions and dimensional rifts, and that would not have been possible without the solid state drive of the PlayStation 5," further adding that it is "screamingly fast. It allows us to build worlds and project players from one place to another in near instantaneous speeds. It is an unbelievable game-changer in terms of, we can now do gameplay where you're in one world and the next moment you're in another." Smith recalled that the team had an idea on leveraging dimensional travel into parallel worlds, citing the 1946 film, It's a Wonderful Life as inspiration for the direction of the game. Smith stated that the team's curiosity was piqued by the question, "What would a different dimension of Ratchet and Clank be like? And in particular, what would Ratchet’s life be like if he didn’t have a Clank?".

On building the game's traversal mechanics, there was a learning opportunity for Insomniac Games to leverage their experiences from past titles they have developed, to improve upon and expand on the traversal mechanics in Rift Apart. Smith stated that "I think the lessons that we learned from Sunset Overdrive and Spider-Man (2018) whereas we might’ve just had a hook shot somewhere, now we’re having areas where you can Hook Shot and then use Phantom Dash and then wall run and then rift tether and it flows together really nicely".

Intrigued by the concept of different choices, outcomes and circumstances shaping the trajectory of one's life, the idea of Rivet was born in tandem with the exploration of the alternate universe setting in the franchise. Lead writer Lauren Mee, and lead animator, Lindsay Thompson, were very interested in a new character that would have their own perspective, and survival instincts embodied by their given circumstances in a darker universe. Thompson described Rivet as having a "tough exterior and perceived coolness, she’s never cynical, dark or cruel. Sure, she might not know the best way to act in a social situation, but she sure as hell isn’t shy." Smith noted that the team were interested in representing complexity and nuance with parallel counterparts of characters, citing the importance of not depicting characters like Rivet as a "one dimensional" antithesis to their counterparts in every way. Mee stressed that it was important that Rivet's lived experiences have not left her jaded, as though she comes with her own struggles, they have not robbed the hope she has in saving her universe against the forces of Emperor Nefarious. Following the creation of Rivet, several auditions were held to find the right voice for the character. The studio later recruited voice actress, Jennifer Hale, who previously voiced the female Commander Shepard in the Mass Effect series. Jim Ward, who has voiced Captain Qwark since the series's inception, was unable to reprise his role for Rift Apart due to his declining health, as he was diagnosed with both Alzheimer's disease and COVID-19; he was replaced with Scott Whyte.

After a launch day patch, the game features a 4K-resolution Fidelity mode running at 30 frames per second and two 60 frames per second modes, dubbed as "Performance" and "Performance Ray-Tracing", running at a lower base resolution. The game also supports high dynamic range. The game takes advantage of the PlayStation 5's DualSense controller, Tempest Engine and dedicated ray tracing hardware to support advanced haptic feedback, 3D spatial audio and real-time ray tracing effects. The PlayStation 5's increased processing power and inclusion of a custom solid-state drive enables the game to feature a greater variety of NPCs, enemies, visual effects, and objects within gameplay scenes than prior entries. Enhancements in the game design aim to significantly reduce loading times when jumping between worlds.

The game had "gone gold" on May 13, 2021, according to Insomniac Games report, meaning that physical copies of the game were ready to be produced, with any further development being patched into the game through software updates.

Music 
Ratchet & Clank: Rift Apart features an original score composed primarily by Mark Mothersbaugh and Wataru Hokoyama. Known for his works in Hotel Transylvania, Thor: Ragnarok and The Croods: A New Age, Mothersbaugh was contacted early in the game's development. Insomniac Games wanted the soundtrack to evoke a retro futuristic sound; this approach informed the sound direction, and led to their subsequent search for the right composer to fulfill this vision. They requested Mothersbaugh who later agreed to compose for the game. Mothersbaugh went for a more experimental sound using various instruments including synthesizers to compose the score. By combining eclectic synth sounds with orchestral beats, Mothersaugh was able to deliver a more cinematic sound experience in line with the guiding vision of the studio.

Release 
Ratchet & Clank: Rift Apart released worldwide on June 11, 2021, and was published by Sony Interactive Entertainment. It was announced at the PlayStation 5 reveal stream on June 11, 2020. At Gamescom's Opening Night Live on August 27, 2020, Insomniac Games presented a 7-minute gameplay demo of the game. On February 11, 2021, Insomniac Games announced several pre-order editions for the game. The standard edition includes a graphically upgraded version of the Carbonox armor from Ratchet & Clank: Going Commando, as well as the Pixelizer weapon from Ratchet & Clank (2016). The digital deluxe edition contains five armor sets, a sticker pack for the new Photo Mode, 20 Raritanium used to upgrade weapons, and a digital soundtrack and artbook. In Sony's State of Play presentation on April 29, 2021, a lengthy 16-minute gameplay trailer was released.

Reception 

Ratchet & Clank: Rift Apart received "generally favorable reviews" according to review aggregator Metacritic.

IGN Jonathon Dornbush praised the visuals of the game, saying that the animations and detailed models helped make "the entire cast to be more expressive than ever". Dornbush additionally felt the game's narrative reached the standards set by animated movies, comparing it favorably to Pixar "in its ability to tell an emotional story while also maintaining its excellent comedy."

Kyle Orland of Ars Technica enjoyed the game's combat, feeling that the core gameplay loop of shooting and dodging enemy projectiles was solid. Orland mentioned that enemy variety could have been better, but felt  that enemies were used to great effect with different combinations. He criticized the gameplay usage of rifts, saying that they were underutilized for a large portion of the game.

Chris Carter of Destructoid praised the game's presentation, saying that "we’re at the point of playable Pixar." Carter praised the performances of the voices cast alongside the soundtrack. He also enjoyed how the new hardware reduced loading times and felt that Rift Apart utilized the DualSense controller well.

Game Informer Andrew Reiner particularly commended the game's visuals, and the designs of the environment, adding that "it steals your eye with its stunning vistas, makes you care about the characters". Reiner made positive comments about the Rift Tether feature, stating that its inclusion in the game elevates the gameplay experience, that quite, "often wowing you with just how different the next world is compared to the one you are currently standing in."

In a glowing review, Ryan Gilliam from Polygon wrote that Rift Apart was an impressive game that took advantage of the PlayStation 5 hardware. "But more importantly, it’s a great entry in a nearly two-decade-old franchise, offering fans more wacky weapons, clever writing, and fresh biomes to explore."

GameSpot Steve Watts gave the game a positive review, praising the outstanding game presentation, inventive weaponry and smooth controls, adding that "Ratchet & Clank: Rift Apart is flashy and technically impressive without feeling self-important."

Sales 
In the United Kingdom, Rift Apart became the second biggest launch of the series behind the remake from 2016. Rift Apart also had the second biggest physical launch for a PlayStation 5 game behind another game developed by Insomniac, the launch title Spider-Man: Miles Morales. Sales in the United Kingdom continued to be strong in the second and third weeks of release as well. In Japan, Rift Apart was the third bestselling retail game during its first week of release, with 14,663 physical copies being sold across the country. Rift Apart was also the bestselling video game software in the United States during the month of its release.

As of July 18, 2021, the game has sold over 1.1 million copies worldwide.

Accolades

References

External links 
 
 
 
 

2021 video games
3D platform games
Action-adventure games
Annie Award winners
British Academy Games Award for Technical Achievement winners
Golden Joystick Award winners
Insomniac Games games
PlayStation 5 games
PlayStation 5-only games
Ratchet & Clank
Single-player video games
Sony Interactive Entertainment games
Third-person shooters
Video game sequels
Video games developed in the United States
Video games featuring female protagonists
Video games about parallel universes
Video games scored by Mark Mothersbaugh
Video games scored by Wataru Hokoyama
Interactive Achievement Award winners
Game Developers Choice Award winners
D.I.C.E. Award for Family Game of the Year winners